Lier Station is located at the village of Lier, Norway on the railway Drammen Line. The station is served by the Oslo Commuter Rail L13, service with half-hour headway by Vy. The station is served by line L1, with one departure at 01:54 to Drammen.

History
The station was opened in 1973 as Tuverud. The station is located just outside the mouth of Lieråsen Tunnel, and the station was opened as part of it. The former Lier Station was located on the track that is now part of the Spikkestad Line.

Railway stations in Buskerud
Railway stations on the Drammen Line
Railway stations opened in 1973
1973 establishments in Norway
Lier, Norway